Schacontia is a genus of moths of the family Crambidae described by Harrison Gray Dyar Jr. in 1914.

Distribution
Schacontia species are distributed across Mexico, south to Central America (Guatemala, Costa Rica, Panama) and South America (Bolivia, Brazil, Ecuador, Venezuela) and the Caribbean (Puerto Rico, Cuba, Hispaniola). A single North American record of Schacontia themis is reported from Sanibel Island, Florida.

Biology
Larvae are internal feeders that may induce galls, and pupate within the host. The only known host plant records are in Capparaceae. In Costa Rica, larvae have been reared from Podangrogyne decipiens. Cleome spinosa has been reported as host for S. chanesalis. Capparis frondosa and Capparis verrucosa are reported for other Schacontia species.

Species
Schacontia atropos Solis & Goldstein, 2013
Schacontia chanesalis (Druce, 1899)
Schacontia clotho Solis & Goldstein, 2013
Schacontia lachesis Solis & Goldstein, 2013
Schacontia medalba (Schaus, 1904)
Schacontia nyx Solis & Goldstein, 2013
Schacontia rasa Solis & Goldstein, 2013
Schacontia speciosa Solis & Goldstein, 2013
Schacontia themis Solis & Goldstein, 2013
Schacontia umbra Solis & Goldstein, 2013
Schacontia ysticalis (Dyar, 1925)

Etymology
Schacontia seems to be Dyar's contraction of Schaus and Acontia, the noctuid genus in which William Schaus mistakenly attributed Schacontia medalba and subsequently designated by Dyar as the type species of Schacontia.

References

Glaphyriinae
Crambidae genera
Taxa named by Harrison Gray Dyar Jr.